Muskoka Magazine was a large format lifestyle magazine published ten times per year in Bracebridge, Ontario. The magazine was freely delivered throughout the Muskoka region and in the greater Toronto area. It existed between 2000 and 2016.

History
Muskoka Magazine was created by publisher Don Smith in 2000. The first edition was launched in July 2000. In June 2005 the magazine was purchased by Osprey Media. In 2007 the company was acquired by Sun Media, a subsidiary of Quebecor Media.

Muskoka Magazine was published by Cottage Country Communications, a division of Sun Media, a subsidiary of Quebecor Media. In April 2015 Sun Media was acquired by Postmedia Network Canada Corp. The office was located in Bracebridge, Ontario. It was published ten times per year: February, April, May, June, July, August, September, October, November and December. The magazine ceased publication in January 2016.

References

External links
"Muskoka Magazine"

2000 establishments in Ontario
2016 disestablishments in Ontario
Defunct magazines published in Canada
Free magazines
Lifestyle magazines published in Canada
Local interest magazines published in Canada
Magazines established in 2000
Magazines disestablished in 2016
Magazines published in Ontario
Monthly magazines published in Canada
Ten times annually magazines